Stefan Draganov (born 13 August 1966) is a former Bulgarian footballer who played as a forward. In his career he played for Lokomotiv Plovdiv, CSKA Sofia, Botev Plovdiv, Hong Kong club Instant-Dict and Portuguese Leixões.

Honours
CSKA Sofia
 A Group: 1991–92
 Bulgarian Cup: 1992–93

Instant-Dict
 Hong Kong First Division: 1997–98

References

External links
 Player Profile at ForaDeJogo.net

Living people
1966 births
Bulgarian footballers
PFC Lokomotiv Plovdiv players
PFC CSKA Sofia players
Botev Plovdiv players
Leixões S.C. players
First Professional Football League (Bulgaria) players
Bulgarian expatriate footballers
Expatriate footballers in Hong Kong
Expatriate footballers in Portugal
Bulgarian expatriate sportspeople in Portugal
Association football forwards
National Premier Soccer League coaches
Bulgarian expatriate sportspeople in the United States
Bulgarian football managers